Kombo-Abedimo is a commune and arrondissement in the Ndian département, Southwest Province, western Cameroon.

References
Ministry of Territorial Administration and Decentralization - Southwest province

Communes of Southwest Region (Cameroon)